Emanuelsville is an unincorporated community in Moore Township in Northampton County, Pennsylvania.  It is part of the Lehigh Valley metropolitan area, which had a population of 861,899 was the 68th most populous metropolitan area in the U.S. as of the 2020 census.

Emanuelsville is located at the intersection of Valley View Drive and Hokendaqua Drive.

References

Unincorporated communities in Northampton County, Pennsylvania
Unincorporated communities in Pennsylvania